The Villa Jeanneret-Perret (also known as Maison blanche) is the first independent project by Swiss architect Le Corbusier. Built in 1912 in La Chaux-de-Fonds, Charles-Edouard Jeanneret's hometown, it was designed for his parents. Open to the public since 2005, the house is under the patronage of the Swiss National Commission for UNESCO and has been proposed by the Swiss Government for inscription on the World Heritage List.

History 
In February 1912, Charles-Edouard Jeanneret opened his own architectural office in La Chaux-de-Fonds, the city where he was born and where he began his career after completing his education at the advanced course of the Ecole d'Art. The architect who later took the name "Le Corbusier" was 25 years old. He had distanced himself from the spirit of Art Nouveau, travelled in Europe and in the Middle East, learned from the masters of modern architecture...The "Maison blanche" was his first independent project and a very personal creation. Jeanneret himself lived and worked in the house from 1912 to 1915. In 1919, the house was sold. It had many owners in the course of the century until 2000, when it was purchased and restored by the "Association Maison blanche" which opened it to the public in 2005.

Design
The Villa Jeanneret-Perret is a witness to the pioneering architecture of the 20th century and the development of Le Corbusier; his characteristic neo-classic style breaks with the regional Art Nouveau and is based on his experience in Paris as a student of Auguste Perret and in Berlin with Peter Behrens.

References

Bibliography 
Maison blanche. Charles-Edouard Jeanneret / Le Corbusier, Karl Spechtenhauser, Arthur Rüegg, Association Maison Blanche / Birkhäuser Verlag, 2020,  (French)
Maison blanche. Charles-Edouard Jeanneret / Le Corbusier, Karl Spechtenhauser, Arthur Rüegg, Association Maison Blanche / Birkhäuser Verlag, 2020,  (English)
Maison blanche. Charles-Edouard Jeanneret / Le Corbusier, Karl Spechtenhauser, Arthur Rüegg, Association Maison Blanche / Birkhäuser Verlag, 2020,  (German)

External links 

  Official website

Le Corbusier buildings
Villas in Switzerland
Monuments and memorials in Switzerland
Cultural property of national significance in the canton of Neuchâtel
Houses completed in 1912
Buildings and structures in the canton of Neuchâtel
La Chaux-de-Fonds
Museums in the canton of Neuchâtel
Historic house museums in Switzerland
1912 establishments in Switzerland
20th-century architecture in Switzerland